Jorge Enrique Rubio is a Cuban trainer in the sport of boxing. Rubio is presumed to be trainer of the Cuban national amateur boxing team but there is no actual proof he was. Rubio trains numerous professional fighters in Miami, Florida, including Gil Reyes, Juan Arroyo, and Stacey Reile. Rubio was announced as Amir Khan's trainer on July 26, 2008. After Khan's disastrous first-round KO defeat at the hands of relatively unknown Colombian Breidis Prescott, Khan and Rubio parted ways.

Rubio is currently the trainer of rising Cuban prospect Hairon Socarras and former Olympic Gold Medalist Luke Campbell.

References

Year of birth missing (living people)
Living people
Cuban boxing trainers
Cuban male boxers